Ian Newhouse (born 25 December 1956) is a Canadian former hurdler. He competed in the men's 400 metres hurdles at the 1984 Summer Olympics.

References

External links
 
 
 
 
 
 

1956 births
Living people
Athletes (track and field) at the 1984 Summer Olympics
Canadian male hurdlers
Olympic track and field athletes of Canada
Athletes (track and field) at the 1982 Commonwealth Games
Commonwealth Games competitors for Canada
Athletes (track and field) at the 1983 Pan American Games
Pan American Games track and field athletes for Canada
World Athletics Championships athletes for Canada
Athletes from Edmonton